Vanacampus is a genus of pipefishes endemic to the ocean waters around the Australian coasts.

Species
The currently recognized species in this genus are:
 Vanacampus margaritifer (W. K. H. Peters, 1868) (mother-of-pearl pipefish)
 Vanacampus phillipi (A. H. S. Lucas, 1891) (Port Phillip pipefish)
 Vanacampus poecilolaemus (W. K. H. Peters, 1868)
 Vanacampus vercoi (Waite & Hale, 1921) (Verco's pipefish)

References

Syngnathidae
Marine fish genera
Taxa named by Gilbert Percy Whitley